Buddy Bradley (July 24, 1905 – July 17, 1972) was an African-American dancer and choreographer of the 1930s and later.

Biography
Born as Clarence Bradley Epps in Harrisburg, Pennsylvania, he began his career in the United States, although he was often not credited for his early work because he was black. He also worked with Billy Pierce, his fellow African-American choreographer.

He first went to England in 1933 and later settled there. He worked on many Broadway and West End shows. He was the first black dancer to choreograph an all-white show in London. He often worked with Andrée Howard, including 1935's "Let's Go Gay".

Bradley also ran his own dance school.

He returned to the US in the late 1960s. He died in New York City on July 17, 1972.

Filmography
Evergreen (1934), choreography
Head over Heels (1937), as choreographer and dancer
Gangway (1937)
The Spider (1940)
The Brass Monkey (1948)

References

 CORRECTION Stephen Bourne, Black in the British Frame - The Black Experience in British Film and Television London: Continuum 2001 ISBN 0826455395

External links
 
 Tribute website
 StreetSwing.com entry

American choreographers
African-American male dancers
African-American dancers
American male dancers
1905 births
1972 deaths
20th-century American dancers
20th-century African-American people